Sir Walter Fletcher  (8 April 1892 – 6 April 1956) was a British businessman, World War I veteran, Special Operations Executive's secret agent and smuggler, fine art artist and Conservative Party politician.

Life and military career

Early life 
Born Walter Fleischl von Marxow, he was the second son of Paul Fleischl von Marxow and his wife Cecile (née Levis)
of Shagbrooke, Reigate, Surrey. His father was an Austrian-born woolbroker, brother of Ernst von Fleischl-Marxow, who became a naturalised British citizen in 1887.

Following education at Charterhouse School and the University of Lausanne, he began training as a manager in the rubber industry.

World War I 
With the outbreak of World War I in 1914 he entered the British Army, obtaining a commission in the Army Ordnance Department. He served in East Africa, and by the end of the war in 1918 had reached the rank of major.

Post-WWI 
In September 1919 he changed his name by deed poll to Walter Fletcher. He returned to Africa, where he managed a large number of rubber plantations. He returned to England, where he subsequently became chairman and managing director of Hecht, Levis and Kahn, a major rubber and commodities company. He held the position for thirty years. In 1928 he married Esme Boyd.

World War II 
In late 1940, Fletcher approached the Special Operations Executive and offers them his speciality, he eventually assigned to the Force 136 and running an operation called Operation Remorse. Originally it was hoped Fletcher could use his contacts to smuggle rubber out of Japanese-occupied Malaya and Indo-China through the Chinese black market. The operation was diversified to include the smuggling of foreign currency, diamonds and machinery to fund the SOE's activities.

Colin Mackenzie, the head of Force 136 (SOE in the Far East), said of Fletcher, “He did it very well… even in the early days I had £20,000 of diamonds across my desk in one go. One estimate is that the net profit was worth £77 million.” Mackenzie also commented:
Walter was gloriously fat. It was rumoured that he won the hundred yards at Charterhouse when he was nineteen stone. I didn’t believe it, but when I saw him running for a bus when he was still nineteen stone I began to believe it might be true.

In 1947 Fletcher was made Commander of the Order of the British Empire for his war service.

Political career 
Politically, Fletcher was a Conservative, and he was selected as the party's prospective parliamentary candidate for the Birkenhead East seat in 1930. However, with the formation of a National Government prior to the 1931 general election he stood aside to allow Henry Graham White, a Liberal member of the government to hold the seat.

He was elected at the 1945 general election as Member of Parliament (MP) for Bury in Lancashire.  When that constituency was abolished for the 1950 election, he was returned for the new Bury and Radcliffe constituency, and held the seat until he retired from the House of Commons at the 1955 general election. In 1953 he was knighted.

Other works 
In addition to his business and political interests, Fletcher had extensive farms in Hertfordshire. He was also an accomplished painter, exhibiting at the Royal Academy and in Bond Street galleries.

Death 
Fletcher died at his London home in April 1956 aged 63. He was buried in Sacombe, near Ware, Hertfordshire.

Honours 

 : Mentioned in dispatches (World War I)
 : Officer of the Most Excellent Order of the British Empire (OBE) (World War I)
 : Commander of the Most Excellent Order of the British Empire (CBE) (1947)
 : Knight Bachelor (1953)

References

External links 

1892 births
1956 deaths
Conservative Party (UK) MPs for English constituencies
UK MPs 1945–1950
UK MPs 1950–1951
UK MPs 1951–1955
Politics of the Metropolitan Borough of Bury
British Special Operations Executive personnel
British expatriates in Switzerland
People educated at Charterhouse School
University of Lausanne alumni
Royal Army Ordnance Corps officers
People from Reigate